Custer's Last Fight (also known as Custer's Last Raid) is a 1912 American silent short Western film. It is the first film about George Armstrong Custer and his final stand at the Battle of the Little Bighorn. Francis Ford, the older brother of director John Ford, directed the two-reel short and also starred in the title role. It was shot principally in "Inceville" at Santa Ynez Canyon in Pacific Palisades, California.

The film was re-released in 1925 and 1933.

Cast
 Francis Ford as George Armstrong Custer
 Grace Cunard as Mrs. Custer
 William Eagle Shirt as Sitting Bull
 J. Barney Sherry as James McLaughlin
 Art Acord as a Trooper
 Ann Little
 Lillian Christy
 Charles K. French
 Snowball as a horse

References

External links 
 
 
 re-edited version on DVD

1912 films
1912 Western (genre) films
1912 short films
American Indian Wars films
American biographical films
American black-and-white films
American silent short films
Battle of the Little Bighorn
Biographical films about people of the American Old West
Cultural depictions of George Armstrong Custer
Cultural depictions of Sitting Bull
Films about Native Americans
Films directed by Francis Ford
Films set in 1876
Films shot in Los Angeles
Silent American Western (genre) films
1910s American films